Monastery of the Holy Trinity in Gornja Kamenica is located on the slopes of the Balkan Mountains, 15 kilometers southeast of Knjaževac, Serbia, between Donja and Gornja Kamenica, on the right bank of the Trgoviški Timok. It belongs to the Eparchy of Timok of Serbian Orthodox Church.

History 
The monastery was burnt and destroyed in the past, and it leaves no important documents about its origin. The only inscription that mentions the founder was renovated in 1848 by the first known abbot of the Holy Trinity, Hieromonk Pantelejmon (Nedeljković). Judging by the inscription in the nave of the temple, it is assumed that the temple was built by the son of Đurađ Branković, despot Lazar Branković in 1457.

Architecture 

According to its architectural design, the church has long been considered to belong to the Morava architectural school, given that its form of a concise triconchos with a dome pointed to it, but the modest rustic masonry and the characteristic set of choir stalls with a domed part indicate that the church was built at the beginning of the 17th century. Fragments of paintings have been preserved in the dome and altar area, as well as on the original western facade of the church. The narthex was added only after the painting, vaulted with a semi-calotate, which is supported on a pair of trompies on the west side. The remains of the frescoes in the chancel today are reduced to areas of plinths and standing figures and certainly belong to the art of the middle of the 17th century.

Thanks to conservation works on architecture in 1950, 1968 and 1970–1971. year, the later exonarthex was removed, which restored the shape it had in the middle of the 17th century.

Gallery

References

Serbian Orthodox monasteries in Serbia
Medieval sites in Serbia
Medieval Serbian Orthodox monasteries
Christian monasteries established in the 15th century